I Escaped from the Gestapo is a 1943 film from King Brothers Productions, directed from Harold Young about a forger forced to work for Nazi spies. It stars Dean Jagger, Mary Brian and John Carradine.

The film was also known as No Escape and Edmund Lowe was meant to star, and Frances Farmer also in a uncredited role, and George McFarland of the Our Gang fame as Billy. Frances Farmer started filming but was accused of assaulting a hairdresser, and forced to leave the set.

Plot
Torgut Lane (Dean Jagger) is a forger who is busted out of prison but then forced to work for Nazi spies in the U.S. printing counterfeit bills, to undermine the war effort. He ultimately finds a way to report their activities, by engraving a telling give-away on the plate to tip off the FBI.

Cast          
Dean Jagger as Torgut Lane
John Carradine as Fritz Martin - Gestapo Agent
Mary Brian as Helen
William Henry as Gordon - Gestapo Agent (as Bill Henry)
Sidney Blackmer as Bergen
Ian Keith as Gerard
Anthony Warde as Lokin (as Anthony Ward)
Edward Keane as Domack - Head of Gestapo Gang
William Marshall as Lunt (as Billy Marshall)
Norman Willis as FBI Chief Rodt
Peter Dunne as Olin
George McFarland as Billy 
Charles Wagenheim as Hart 
Rest of cast listed alphabetically:
Frances Farmer as (montage sequence) (uncredited)

References

External links

1943 films
American mystery films
Films directed by Harold Young (director)
World War II films made in wartime
Monogram Pictures films
1943 mystery films
American black-and-white films